Dicobalt hexacarbonyl acetylene complexes are a family of In organocobalt compounds with the formula . A large variety of R groups are tolerated. They are red compounds that are soluble in organic solvents. They arise from the reaction of alkynes and dicobalt octacarbonyl:

According to X-ray crystallography, the two Co atoms and two alkyne carbons form the vertices of a distorted tetrahedron.  The C-C distance for the bridging alkyne ligand is 1.33 Å, and the Co-Co distance is 2.47 Å.  The  core has C2v symmetry.  The structure is related to that of methylidynetricobaltnonacarbonyl and tetracobalt dodecacarbonyl, which are also tetrahedranes. 

These complexes are intermediates in the Pauson-Khand reaction.

References

Organocobalt compounds
Carbonyl complexes